Collegium Da Vinci is a Polish private university in Poznan.

History 
June 10, 1996 the Minister of Education granted permission for the establishment of the Higher School of Humanities and Journalism in Poznan, where the initiator and founder is Piotr Voelkel. WSNHiD was included in the list of private universities at number 90. In the same year, the first students began their training at the direction of political science and social sciences. Two years later, WSNHiD added a new direction - international relations. In 2000, running are further directions - sociology and cultural studies, and in the following year - computer science. In 2006, the university obtains authorization to education in educational theory.

In July 2004 an agreement was concluded with the Institute of the Western Institute joint venture research and teaching, while in February 2008 WSNHiD has established close cooperation with the University of Social Sciences and Humanities in Warsaw. In June 2014 WSNHiD and Western Institute in Poznań signed an agreement to establish a Center for Scientific under the name Greater Scientific and Research Centre.

In 2014, The School of Humanities has changed its name to the Collegium Da Vinci.

Rectors 
1996 – 1999: PhD. Kazimierz Robakowski, prof. UAM
1999 – 2002: PhD. Anna Michalska, prof. WSNHiD
2002 – 2008: prof. dr. Waldemar Łazuga
2008 – 2012: prof. dr. Karol Olejnik
2012 – 2022: PhD. Krzysztof Nowakowski
2022 – ...: Marek Zieliński PhD, DSc

References

External links 
  CDV
 Photos of campus CDV

Universities and colleges in Poznań
1996 establishments in Poland
Educational institutions established in 1996